Rémy Chevrin (born 12 April 1963) is a French cinematographer. Before his first full-length features he began as assistant to Darius Khondji.

Selected filmography
 1997:  (by )
 2009: Tellement proches
 2014: To Life
 2016: The Jews
 2017: Sous le même toit
 2017: Le Brio
 2019: My Dog Stupid
 2022: Winter Boy (Le Lycéen)

References

External links
 
 Official website

French cinematographers
1963 births
Living people